Andisheh TV (ATV) was a 24-hour television station based in Woodland Hills, Los Angeles, California, founded and launched in June 2006. ATV broadcasts in Persian, via the Hotbird satellite, and Eutelsat satellite to Iran, the Middle East, and Europe. The station was also widely viewed in Afghanistan and Tajikistan where there are large Persian speaking populations.

ATV featured news, political, informational, economic and business updates, current daily affairs, weekly opinions and analysis breakdowns from worldwide subject matter experts and various special broadcasts and educational programs with a line-up of locally produced shows.

In later years, Andisheh TV was run by Parviz Kardan, a well-known figure in pre-1979 Iranian broadcasting. The channel ceased operations in 2017.

References

External links 
Andisheh TV

Iranian-American culture in Los Angeles
2006 establishments in California
2017 disestablishments in California
Television channels and stations established in 2006
Television channels and stations disestablished in 2017